Phalangodes is a genus of armoured harvestmen in the family Phalangodidae. There is at least one described species in Phalangodes, P. armata.

References

Further reading

External links

 

Harvestmen
Articles created by Qbugbot